Heaven is the place where deities originate, and where earthly beings may experience an afterlife.

Heaven may also refer to:
 Celestial sphere, the sky as seen from the Earth
 Heaven in Judaism
 Garden of Eden 
 Heaven in Christianity
 Heaven in Islam
 Jannah, Paradise in Islam
 Paradise, the abode of the righteous dead in religious traditions from around the world
 Tian, a concept translated as Heaven central to Chinese religion and philosophy

People 
Surname
 Constance Heaven (1911–1995) or Christina Merlin, British writer of romance novels
 Dave Heaven (born 1959), British musician
 Frank Heaven (1873–1905), cricketer and football administrator

Given name
 Heaven Tanudiredja (born 1982), Indonesian fashion designer in Belgium
 Heaven Peralejo (born 1999), Filipina actress, model and singer

Films
 Heaven (1987 film), a documentary written and produced by Diane Keaton
 Heaven (1998 film), a crime drama starring Martin Donovan
 Heaven (2000 film), a Canadian comedy-drama film directed by Jean-Sébastien Lord
 Heaven (2002 film), a drama/romantic thriller directed by Tom Tykwer starring Cate Blanchett and Giovanni Ribisi
 Heaven (2018 film), a dramatic television film starring Annalise Basso based on the V. C. Andrews novel
 Heaven (2022 film), a Malayalam film directed by Unni Govindraj starring Suraj Venjaramoodu

Literature
 Heaven (Andrews novel), a 1985 novel by V. C. Andrews
 Heaven (Kawakami novel), a 2009 novel by Mieko Kawakami
 Heaven (Stewart and Cohen novel), a 2004 novel by Ian Stewart and Jack Cohen
 Heaven, a 1998 novel by Angela Johnson
 Heaven, a manga by Aoi Nanase
 Heaven!!, a manga by Shizuru Seino
 Heaven (Oh My Goddess!), a fictional divine faction in the manga

Music

Performers and labels
 Heaven (Australian band), a heavy metal group
 Heaven (British band), a jazz-rock group in the late 1960s and early 1970s
 Heaven (Romanian band), a pop-dance girl group
 Heaven Music, an independent record label in Athens, Greece
 Heaven Records, the record label of Fat Tulips

Albums
 Heaven (BeBe & CeCe Winans album) or the title song, 1988
 Heaven (Cosmic Baby album), 1999
 Heaven (Dilly Dally album) or the title song, 2018
 Heaven (DJ Sammy album) or the title cover of the Bryan Adams song (see below), 2002
 Heaven (Jason Rowe album) or the title song, 1997
 Heaven (Miliyah Kato album) or the title song, 2010
 Heaven (Mobius Band album), 2007
 Heaven (Nina Girado album) or the title song (see below), 2002
 Heaven (Pomegranates album) or the title song, 2012
 Heaven (Rebecca Ferguson album), 2011
 Heaven (Ron Miles album), 2002
 Heaven (Shockabilly album), 1985
 Heaven (The Walkmen album) or the title song, 2012
 Heaven, by the Avener, 2020
 Heaven, by Jimmy Scott, 1996
 Heaven, by U96, or the title song (see below), 1996
 Heavn, by Jamila Woods, or the title song, 2016

Songs
 "Heaven" (After School song), 2013
 "Heaven" (Ailee song), 2012
 "Heaven" (Avicii song), 2019
 "Heaven" (Ayumi Hamasaki song), 2005
 "Heaven" (Beyoncé song), 2013
 "Heaven" (1977 Bonnie Tyler song)
 "Heaven" (Bryan Adams song), 1985, covered by DJ Sammy and Yanou featuring Do, 2001 
 "Heaven" (Buck-Tick song), 2008
 "Heaven" (The Chimes song), 1989
 "Heaven" (Chris Rea song), 1991
 "Heaven" (D mol song), represented Montenegro at Eurovision 2019
 "Heaven" (Depeche Mode song), 2013
 "Heaven" (Emeli Sandé song), 2011
 "Heaven" (Inna song), 2016
 "Heaven" (Jay-Z song), 2013
 "Heaven" (John Legend song), 2006
 "Heaven" (Jónsi song), represented Iceland at Eurovision 2004
 "Heaven" (Julia Michaels song), 2018
 "Heaven" (Kane Brown song), 2017
 "Heaven" (Live song), 2003
 "Heaven" (Los Lonely Boys song), 2004
 "Heaven" (Namie Amuro song), 2013
 "Heaven" (Nina Girado song), 2002
 "Heaven" (The Psychedelic Furs song), 1984
 "Heaven" (Shaun Frank and Kshmr song), 2015
 "Heaven" (Solo song), 1995
 "Heaven" (Talking Heads song), 1979
 "Heaven" (Troye Sivan song), 2015
 "Heaven" (U96 song), 1996
 "Heaven" (Warrant song), 1989
 "Heaven (Must Be There)", by Eurogliders, 1984
 "Heaven"/"Squall", a double A-side single by Masaharu Fukuyama, 1999
 "Heaven", by Abandon All Ships from Geeving, 2010
 "Heaven", by Alpha Rev from New Morning, 2010
 "Heaven", by Angels & Airwaves from I-Empire, 2007
 "Heaven", by Ava Max from Heaven & Hell, 2020
 "Heaven", by Bazzi, 2022
 "Heaven", by Becky Hill, 2023
 "Heaven", by Better Than Ezra from Deluxe, 1993
 "Heaven", by Bitter:Sweet from The Mating Game, 2006
 "Heaven", by Blink-182 from Nine, 2019
 "Heaven", by Bonnie Tyler from All in One Voice, 1998
 "Heaven", by Brett Dennen from Hope for the Hopeless, 2008
 "Heaven", by Callum Scott fromBridges, 2022
 "Heaven", by Carl Wilson from Carl Wilson, 1981
 "Heaven", by Cheryl Cole from 3 Words, 2009
 "Heaven", by the Cockroaches from The Cockroaches, 1987
 "Heaven", by Demi Lovato from Holy Fvck, 2022
 "Heaven", by Duke Ellington from Second Sacred Concert, 1968
 "Heaven", by Dune, 2000
 "Heaven", by En Vogue from Soul Flower, 2004
 "Heaven", by Eurythmics from Savage, 1987
 "Heaven", by Finneas, 2018
 "Heaven", by the Fire Theft from The Fire Theft, 2003
 "Heaven", by Fits of Gloom, 1994
 "Heaven", by Geraint Watkins, 2004
 "Heaven", by Gibson Brothers, 1977
 "Heaven", by Gotthard from Homerun, 2001
 "Heaven", by Guano Apes from Don't Give Me Names, 2000
 "Heaven", by Health from Health, 2007
 "Heaven", by Hurts from Exile, 2013
 "Heaven", by Janne Da Arc, 2006
 "Heaven", by Jars of Clay from The Long Fall Back to Earth, 2009
 "Heaven", by John Frusciante from The Empyrean, 2009
 "Heaven", by K. Michelle from Kimberly: The People I Used to Know, 2017
 "Heaven", by Kelly Rowland from Simply Deep, 2022
 "Heaven", by Khalid from Free Spirit, 2019
 "Heaven", by Natalia Kills from Perfectionist, 2011
 "Heaven", by Nelly from M.O., 2013
 "Heaven", by Niall Horan, 2023
 "Heaven", by Nidji, 2005
 "Heaven", by No Doubt from Push and Shove, 2012
 "Heaven", by Nu Flavor, 1997
 "Heaven", by OneRepublic from Oh My My, 2016
 "Heaven", by P-Model from Perspective, 1982
 "Heaven", by the Rapture from Echoes, 2003
 "Heaven", by the Rascals from Freedom Suite, 1969
 "Heaven", by the Rolling Stones from Tattoo You, 1981
 "Heaven", by Tigertailz from Bezerk, 1990
 "Heaven", by Todrick Hall from Forbidden, 2018
 "Heaven", by Tweet from Southern Hummingbird, 2002
 "Heaven", by UGK from Underground Kingz, 2007
 "Heaven", by Unkle from More Stories, 2008
 "Heaven", by Until December, 1986
 "Heaven (Don't Have a Name)", by Sam Feldt, 2018
 "Heaven (Little by Little)", by Theory of a Deadman from Scars & Souvenirs, 2008

Other
 Heaven (nightclub), a nightclub in London, UK
 Heaven (play), a 2011 play by Kit Brookman

See also 
 Heaven and Hell (disambiguation)
 Heavenly (disambiguation)
 Heavens (disambiguation)
 Hell (disambiguation)
 Paradise (disambiguation)
 Seven heavens, a summary of commonalities among the major religions
7th Heaven, TV series
Heaven is a Place on Earth

English-language unisex given names